Rattlesnake Key may refer to:

Rattlesnake Key (Tampa Bay), a key in Tampa Bay, Manatee County, Florida
 Long Key,  an island in the middle Florida Keys called Cayo Vivora (Rattlesnake Key) by early Spanish explorers, a reference to the shape of the island which resembles a snake with its jaws open